Ranoj Pegu is an Indian Politician and the current Member of Legislative Assembly of Assam from Dhemaji and current Minister of Education, Welfare of Plain Tribe & Backward Classes (non-BTC). On May 10, 2021, Ranoj took oath as the Minister of Education, Welfare of Plain Tribe & Backward Classes (non-BTC).

Education
He has an MBBS degree from Gauhati Medical College and Hospital in 1987.

References 

7. Assam: Ranoj Pegu is new education minister          https://guwahatitimes.com/assam-ranoj-pegu-is-new-education-minister/?amp=1

Assam politicians
Year of birth missing (living people)
Living people
Assam MLAs 2016–2021
Bharatiya Janata Party politicians from Assam